Paratrigona is a genus of bees belonging to the family Apidae.

The species of this genus are found in Southern America.

Species:

Paratrigona anduzei 
Paratrigona catabolonota 
Paratrigona compsa 
Paratrigona crassicornis 
Paratrigona eutaeniata 
Paratrigona euxanthospila 
Paratrigona femoralis 
Paratrigona glabella 
Paratrigona guatemalensis 
Paratrigona guigliae 
Paratrigona haeckeli 
Paratrigona impunctata 
Paratrigona incerta 
Paratrigona isopterophila 
Paratrigona lineata 
Paratrigona lineatifrons 
Paratrigona lophocoryphe 
Paratrigona lundelli 
Paratrigona melanaspis 
Paratrigona myrmecophila 
Paratrigona nuda 
Paratrigona onorei 
Paratrigona opaca 
Paratrigona ornaticeps 
Paratrigona pacifica 
Paratrigona pannosa 
Paratrigona peltata 
Paratrigona permixta 
Paratrigona prosopiformis 
Paratrigona rinconi 
Paratrigona scapisetosa 
Paratrigona subnuda 
Paratrigona uwa 
Paratrigona wasbaueri

References

Meliponini